Zambia competed at the 2018 Commonwealth Games in the Gold Coast, Australia from April 4 to April 15, 2018 It was Zambia's 14th appearance at the Commonwealth Games.

Squash athlete Kelvin Ndhlovu was the country's flag bearer during the opening ceremony.

Competitors
The following is the list of number of competitors participating at the Games per sport/discipline.

Athletics

Men
Track & road events

Women
Track & road events

Badminton

Zambia participated with four athletes (two men and two women)

Singles

Doubles

Mixed team

Roster
Chongo Mulenga
Kalombo Mulenga
Everlyn Siamupangila
Ogar Siamupangila

Pool B

Boxing

Zambia participated with a team of 5 athletes (5 men).

Men

Lawn bowls

Zambia will compete in Lawn bowls.

Women

Rugby sevens

Men's tournament

Zambia qualified a men's rugby sevens team of 12 athletes, by finishing in second place among Commonwealth nations at the 2017 Africa Cup Sevens. This will mark the country's Commonwealth Games debut in the sport.

Roster

Davy Chimbukulu
Martin Chisanga
Edmond Hamayuwa
Israel Kalumba
Carlos Kanyama
Fernard Kashimoto
Larry Kaushiku
Terry Kayamba
Guy Lipschitz
Sheleni Michelo
Laston Mukosa
Edward Mumba

Pool C

Squash

Zambia participated with 2 athletes (2 men).

Individual

Doubles

Swimming

Zambia participated with 4 athletes (3 men and 1 woman).

Men

Women

Table tennis

Zambia participated with 1 athlete (1 man).

Singles

See also
Zambia at the 2018 Summer Youth Olympics

References

Nations at the 2018 Commonwealth Games
Zambia at the Commonwealth Games
2018 in Zambian sport